José Rafael Albrecht (23 August 1941 – 3 May 2021) was an Argentine professional footballer who played as a defender. He represented Argentina at the 1962 and 1966 World Cups.

Career
Albrecht was born in Tucumán.  He started his career with Club Atlético Tucumán in 1957. In 1960, he was signed by Estudiantes, where he excelled and, thus, was called to play for the Argentina national team in 1961.

In 1962 he was transferred to San Lorenzo for 10 million pesos, a huge amount for those days. In San Lorenzo, he was part of two famous teams, the 'Carsucias' in 1964 and the 'Matadores' in 1968. The 'Matadores' team won the 1968 Metropolitano Championship without losing a single game. He played 229 games for the club, scoring 56 goals. Most of them were by way of penalties.

In 1970 Albrecht moved to Mexico. He first played with Club León, helping the team win two Copa México and two Campeón de Campeones super cups. He then played for Atlas, where he retired from football in 1975.

Albrecht played a total of 506 top flight games in his career, scoring a total of 95 goals, putting him in 7th place on the IFFHS list of top scoring defenders.

Death
Albrecht died on 3 May 2021, aged 79, after two weeks of hospitalisation with COVID-19, amid the COVID-19 pandemic in Argentina.

Honours
Atlético Tucumán
 Argentine Primera División: Torneo República 1960

San Lorenzo
 Argentine Primera División: Metropolitano 1968

Club León
 Copa México: 1970–71, 1971–72
 Campeón de Campeones: 1970–71, 1971–72

References

External links
 
 

1941 births
2021 deaths
Sportspeople from San Miguel de Tucumán
Argentina international footballers
Association football defenders
Estudiantes de La Plata footballers
San Lorenzo de Almagro footballers
Club León footballers
Atlas F.C. footballers
Argentine Primera División players
Liga MX players
Argentine expatriate footballers
Argentine footballers
Expatriate footballers in Mexico
1962 FIFA World Cup players
1966 FIFA World Cup players
Argentine people of German descent
1967 South American Championship players
Atlas F.C. managers
Argentine football managers
Deaths from the COVID-19 pandemic in Argentina